Easy Livin' is a compilation album by hard rock band Uriah Heep comprising almost all the band's singles, including several songs not available in the original albums.

Track listing

References

2006 compilation albums
B-side compilation albums
Uriah Heep (band) compilation albums
Sanctuary Records compilation albums